The 1950 Brighouse and Spenborough by-election was a parliamentary by-election held in the United Kingdom on 4 May 1950 for the House of Commons in the marginal constituency of Brighouse and Spenborough. The seat became vacant on the death of Frederick Arthur Cobb, who has been the local Member of Parliament (MP) for only 3 months, since the general election in February 1950. He had previously been the MP for Elland from 1945.

The result was a narrow hold for the Labour Party. The winning candidate was John Edwards, former Parliamentary Secretary to the Board of Trade, who had lost his seat in the general election. He went on to hold Brighouse and Spenborough until his death in 1959, when the resulting by-election in 1960 was narrowly won by the Conservative and National Liberal candidate Michael Shaw.

References

See also
1960 Brighouse and Spenborough by-election
List of United Kingdom by-elections

1950 in England
By-elections to the Parliament of the United Kingdom in West Yorkshire constituencies
1950 elections in the United Kingdom
Elections in Calderdale
Elections in Kirklees
1950s in Yorkshire